Finella pupoides is a species of small sea snail, a marine gastropod mollusk in the family Scaliolidae.

Description
The shell size varies between 2 mm and 4 mm. Its color varies from white to pale yellow, a few times even dark brown. The shell shows typically two indistinct brown bands below the suture and at the base. The shell is elongate, fusiform with a narrow, pointed apex. This protoconch is smooth and contains about 2.5 whorls. The whorls are rather inflated and have deeply marked sutures. The sculpture of the teleoconch has characteristic flat-topped spiral cords with rather weak axial ribs. These form a fine reticulate pattern on the upper whorls. This axial sculpture is reduced to absent on the  body whorl. The aperture is semicircular. The narrow columella is curved.

Distribution
This species occurs in the Indian Ocean along Réunion and in the Pacific Ocean in Southeast Asia and Japan; and as non-indigenous marine species through the Suez Canal in European waters and the Mediterranean Sea

Habitat
This species is found in sand or on mud in the sublittoral zone of bays at a depth of 10 m. Live species are rare and this species can be regarded as an endangered species.

References

 Adams A. (1860) On some new genera and species of Mollusca from Japan. Annals and Magazine of Natural History, (3)5: 299-303
 Dautzenberg, Ph. (1929). Contribution à l'étude de la faune de Madagascar: Mollusca marina testacea. Faune des colonies françaises, III(fasc. 4). Société d'Editions géographiques, maritimes et coloniales: Paris. 321-636, plates IV-VII pp.
 Laseron C.F. (1956) The families Rissoinidae and Rissoidae (Mollusca) from the Solanderian and Dampierian zoogeographical provinces. Australian Journal of Marine and Freshwater Research 7(3): 384-484. [October 1956] page(s): 463 
 Hasegawa K. (1998) A review of Recent Japanese species previously assigned to Eufenella and Clathrofenella (Mollusca: Gastropoda: Cerithioidea). Memoiurs of the National Science Museum, Tokyo 31: 165-186
 Gofas, S.; Le Renard, J.; Bouchet, P. (2001). Mollusca, in: Costello, M.J. et al. (Ed.) (2001). European register of marine species: a check-list of the marine species in Europe and a bibliography of guides to their identification. Collection Patrimoines Naturels, 50: pp. 180–213
 Streftaris, N.; Zenetos, A.; Papathanassiou, E. (2005). Globalisation in marine ecosystems: the story of non-indigenous marine species across European seas. Oceanogr. Mar. Biol. Annu. Rev. 43: 419-453

External links
 Melvill J.C. & Standen R. (1896) Notes on a collection of shells from Lifu and Uvea, Loyalty Islands, formed by the Rev. James and Mrs. Hadfield, with list of species. Part II. Journal of Conchology 8: 273-315, page(s): 309, pl. 11 fig. 69

Scaliolidae
Gastropods described in 1860